The 56th Filipino Academy of Movie Arts and Sciences Awards Night was held on  November 25, 2007 at  Le Pavilion, Function Place, Metrobank Park, Diosdado Macapagal Boulevard, Pasay.

Kasal, Kasali, Kasalo, produced by Malou Santos & Charo Santos-Concio, is the recipient of this edition's FAMAS Award for Best Picture.

Awards

Major Awards
Winners are listed first and highlighted with boldface.

{| class=wikitable
|-
! style="background:#EEDD82; width:50%" | Best Picture
! style="background:#EEDD82; width:50%" | Best Director
|-
| valign="top" |
 Kasal, Kasali, Kasalo — Malou Santos, Charo Santos-Concio 
 Inang Yaya — Maricel Soriano, Wyngard Tracy 
 Summer Heat — Arlene L. Sy	
 Kubrador — Joji Alonso
 Umaaraw, Umuulan — Harlene Bautista, Hero Bautista
| valign="top" |
 Jose Javier Reyes — Kasal, Kasali, Kasalo
 Joyce Bernal — Don't Give Up on Us
 Pablo Biglang-Awa, Veronica Velasco — Inang Yaya
 Jeffrey Jeturian — Kubrador
 Brilliante Mendoza — Summer Heat
|-
! style="background:#EEDD82; width:50%" | Best Actor
! style="background:#EEDD82; width:50%" | Best Actress
|-
| valign="top" |
 Cesar Montano — Ligalig
 Ryan Agoncillo — Umaaraw, Umuulan
 Johnny Delgado — Summer Heat
 Piolo Pascual — Don't Give Up on Us
 Jericho Rosales — Pacquiao: The Movie
| valign="top" |
 Judy Ann Santos — Kasal, Kasali, Kasalo
 Claudine Barretto — Sukob
 Gina Pareño — Kubrador
 Cherry Pie Picache — Summer Heat
 Maricel Soriano — Inang Yaya
|-
! style="background:#EEDD82; width:50%" | Best Supporting Actor
! style="background:#EEDD82; width:50%" | Best Supporting Actress
|-
| valign="top" |
 Allen Dizon — Twilight Dancers
 Tommy Abuel — Don't Give Up on Us
 Jimmy Concepcion — Barang
 Allan Paule — Summer Heat
 Wendell Ramos — Sukob
| valign="top" |
 Gina Pareño — Kasal, Kasali, Kasalo
 Tetchie Agbayani — Close to You
 Rio Locsin — Don't Give Up on Us
 Liza Lorena — Barang
 Maja Salvador — Sukob
|-
! style="background:#EEDD82; width:50%" | Best Child Actor
! style="background:#EEDD82; width:50%" | Best Child Actress
|-
| valign="top" |
 Christian Luis Singson — Barang
 Rex Dimaguiba — Close to You
 Aaron Junatas — Donsol
 Abijah Sarmienta — Umaaraw, Umuulan
 Jessie Trinidad — Inang Yaya
| valign="top" |
 Tala Santos — Inang Yaya
 Anna Marie Gallo — Close to You
 Loida Manuel — Sukob
 Zeke Sarmienta — Umaaraw, Umuulan
|- 
! style="background:#EEDD82; width:50%" | Best Screenplay
! style="background:#EEDD82; width:50%" | Best Cinematography
|-
| valign="top" |
 Jose Javier Reyes — Kasal, Kasali, Kasalo
 Veronica Velasco — Inang Yaya
 Dindo Perez — Don't Give Up on Us
| valign="top" |
 Eli Balce — Donsol
 Odyssey Flores — Summer Heat
 Gary Gardoce — Inang Yaya
 Charlie Peralta — Don't Give Up on Us
 Monchie Redoble — Kasal, Kasali, Kasalo
|-
! style="background:#EEDD82; width:50%" | Best Art Direction
! style="background:#EEDD82; width:50%" | Best Sound
|-
| valign="top" |
 Raymond Bajarias — Sukob
 Gessan Enriquez — Donsol
 Dante Nico Garcia — Don't Give Up on Us
 Benjamin Padero — Summer Heat
 Willy Urbino — Kasal, Kasali, Kasalo
| valign="top" |
 Albert Michael Idioma — Sukob
 Richard Arellano — Umaaraw, Umuulan
 Lamberto Casas, Jr. — You Are the One
 Albert Michael Idioma — Kasal, Kasali, Kasalo
 Addiss Tabong — Don't Give Up on Us
|-
! style="background:#EEDD82; width:50%" | Best Editing
! style="background:#EEDD82; width:50%" | Best Special Effects
|-
| valign="top" |
 Vito Cajili — Kasal, Kasali, Kasalo
 Philip Espina — Summer Heat
 Randy Gabriel — Inang Yaya
 Jay Halili — Kubrador
 Marya Ignacio — Don't Give Up on Us
| valign="top" |
 Peping Carmona — Sukob
 Roland Salem — Sa Ilalim ng Cogon
|-
! style="background:#EEDD82; width:50%" | Best Visual Effects
! style="background:#EEDD82; width:50%" | Best Story
|-
| valign="top" |
 Larger than Life — Ligalig
 Rey Ariestain — Barang
 Emil Guinto — Umaaraw, Umuulan
| valign="top" |
 Jose Javier Reyes — Kasal, Kasali, Kasalo
 Ralston Jover — Kubrador
 Brilliante Mendoza, Boots Pastor — Summer Heat 
 Nick Joseph Olanka — Huling Araw ng Linggo
 Veronica Velasco — Inang Yaya
|-
! style="background:#EEDD82; width:50%" | Best Theme Song
! style="background:#EEDD82; width:50%" | Best Musical Score
|-
| valign="top" |
  "Hawak Kamay" — Kasal, Kasali, Kasalo (Yeng Constantino)
 "Bukas Muli" — Summer Heat (Romy Guinoo)
 "Nanay" — Inang Yaya (Joey Benn)
 "Umaaraw, Umuulan"  — Umaaraw, Umuulan (Rivermaya)
 "Walang Hanggang Paalam" — Donsol (Joey Ayala)
| valign="top" |
 Jesse Lucas — Kasal, Kasali, Kasalo
 Nonong Buencamino — Inang Yaya 
 Jesse Lucas — Donsol
 Raul Mitra — Don't Give Up On Us
 Alfredo Ongleo — Umaaraw, Umuulan
|}

Special AwardsFilipino Academy of Movie Arts and Sciences Grand AwardGerman MorenoAtty. Flavio G. Macaso Memorial AwardLarry DominguezDr. Jose Perez Memorial Award for JournalismErnie PechoFernando Poe, Jr. Memorial AwardRudy FernandezGerman Moreno Youth Achievement Award JC de Vera
 Maja SalvadorGolden Artist Award Jolina MagdangalInternational Artist Award Billy CrawfordPresidential Award Robert RiveraPosthumous Award Ramon ZamoraLifetime Achievement Award Celso Ad. Castillo
 Gloria SevillaSpecial Citation'''
 Vic del Rosario, Jr. [Movie Production]

References

External links
The Unofficial Website of the Filipino Academy of Movie Arts and Sciences
FAMAS Awards

FAMAS Award
FAM
FAM